Maria Constança Dias Urbano de Sousa (born 1 April 1967) is a Portuguese jurist and the country's former Minister of Internal Administration.

Education
Constança Urbano de Sousa graduated in Law from the Faculty of Law of the University of Coimbra, in 1991, and received a postgraduate degree in European Law and a doctorate in Law from Saarland University, in Germany, in 1994 and 1997, respectively.

Professional career
She is a former Portuguese Minister of Internal Administration, in António Costa's cabinet. During her tenure, Portugal experienced the deadliest wildfires ever, firstly in Pedrogão Grande in June 2017 (65 dead) and later across the country in October 2017 (41 dead).
In the sequence of the wildfires in Portugal in June and October, Constança Urbano de Sousa resigned on 18 October 2017.

From 2006 to 2012, she coordinated the Justice and Internal Affairs group of Portugal's Permanent Representation to the European Union. For six years, she headed the national delegation to the Strategic Committee on Immigration, Frontiers and Asylum of the European Union, which she chaired in 2007, and was part of other committees of Council of the European Union.

Personal life
She was born in the civil parish (freguesia) of Sé Nova, in Coimbra, the daughter of former Ombudsman Alfredo José de Sousa and Maria Clara Pires Dias Urbano de Sousa.

She lives in Cascais, a cosmopolitan suburb of the Portuguese capital.

References

1967 births
Government ministers of Portugal
Women government ministers of Portugal
Living people
People from Coimbra
People from Cascais
20th-century Portuguese lawyers
Portuguese women lawyers
University of Coimbra alumni
Female interior ministers